Milan Srškić (3 March 1880 – 12 April 1937) was a Yugoslav politician and lawyer, Prime Minister of the Kingdom of Yugoslavia during the dictatorship of King Alexander I.

Even before the establishment of the 6 January Dictatorship, Srškić had on the behalf of the palace worked to undermine and weaken his party, the People's Radical Party and he had fully backed the dictatorship from its inception - his promotion to Prime Minister represented a return to a more repressive regime after the loosening of control under his predecessor, Marinković.

References 

1880 births
1937 deaths
Politicians from Belgrade
People from the Principality of Serbia
Prime Ministers of Yugoslavia
Grand Crosses of the Order of the White Lion